The 1940 City of London by-election was a by-election held on 5 February 1940 for the British House of Commons constituency of City of London, which covered the "Square Mile" which was the United Kingdom's traditional financial district.

The by-election was caused by the resignation of one of the city's two Conservative Party Members of Parliament (MPs) Sir Alan Anderson, who had held the seat since a by-election in 1935.

In accordance with the war-time electoral pact, neither the Labour nor the Liberal parties fielded a candidate. The Conservatives did not defend the seat either, instead supporting the National candidate, Sir Andrew Duncan, who had been brought in from industry to serve as President of the Board of Trade.

There being no other candidates, Duncan was returned unopposed.

Election results

References

See also 
 List of United Kingdom by-elections
 City of London constituency
 1922 City of London by-election
 1924 City of London by-election
 1935 City of London by-election
 1938 City of London by-election
 1945 City of London by-election

City of London,1940
City of London by-election
Unopposed by-elections to the Parliament of the United Kingdom (need citation)
City of London by-election
City of London,1940
City of London,1940
City of London by-election